San Giusto may refer to:

 , a 1993 San Giorgio-class amphibious transport dock of the Italian Navy
 San Giusto, a neighbourhood of Pisa, Tuscany, Italy

Buildings in Italy
 San Giusto Abbey (disambiguation), several buildings
 San Giusto Cathedral (disambiguation), several buildings
 San Giusto, Lucca, a church in Lucca, Province of Lucca, Tuscany
 San Giusto, Pievebovigliana, a church in Pievebovigliana, Province of Macerata, Marche
 San Giusto, Volterra, a church in Volterra, Province of Pisa, Tuscany

See also
 San Giusto Canavese, a comune in the Metropolitan City of Turin, Piedmont, Italy
 Monte San Giusto, a comune in the Province of Macerata, Marche, Italy
 Justus (given name)